Lyman E. Abbott (March 1, 1912 – January 17, 1981) was an American football and basketball coach.  He was the head football coach at Adrian College in Adrian, Michigan for four seasons, from 1946 to 1949, compiling a record of 12–20–1.  Abbott was also the head basketball coach at Adrian from 1946 to 1950, tallying a mark of 21–63.

Head coaching record

Football

References

External links
 

1912 births
1981 deaths
Adrian Bulldogs football coaches
Adrian Bulldogs men's basketball coaches